Duncan McTier is an English double bass soloist and professor. He is a member of the Fibonacci Sequence.

Biography
Born in Worcestershire, England, Duncan McTier studied a degree in mathematics at Bristol University before joining the BBC Symphony Orchestra and the Netherlands Chamber Orchestra. McTier won the Isle of Man International Double Bass Competition in 1982 and since then he has performed often with many orchestras, including the Academy of St. Martin in the Fields, Royal Scottish National Orchestra, English Chamber Orchestra, Scottish Chamber Orchestra, BBC Scottish Symphony Orchestra, Concertgebouw Chamber Orchestra, RTVE Symphony Orchestra and the Orchestre de Chambre de Lausanne.

He recorded a series of albums with the pianist Kathron Sturrock.

In November 2014 McTier received a non-custodial sentence after pleading guilty to two indecent assaults and one attempted indecent assault, during the 1980s and 1990s, on former students aged between 17 and 23.

From 1996-2014 McTier was a professor of double bass at the Royal Academy of Music in London and is currently professor at the Queen Sofía College of Music in Madrid, Spain.

References

External links 
 

Living people
Academics of the Royal Academy of Music
British double-bassists
Male double-bassists
Academic staff of the Reina Sofía School of Music
Honorary Members of the Royal Academy of Music
Academic staff of the Zurich University of the Arts
English people convicted of indecent assault
21st-century double-bassists
21st-century British male musicians
Year of birth missing (living people)
English expatriates in Switzerland
English expatriates in Spain